Bele (Geʽez: በሌ) or (Wolaita: Bale) is a city in Wolayita Zone of Southern Nations, Nationalities, and Peoples' Region, Ethiopia. It is administrative capital of Kindo Koysha district of Wolayita Zone, Ethiopia. Bele is located about 400 km away from Addis Ababa to the south on the path Addis-Butajira-Sodo and 38 km westward from Sodo, the capital of Wolaita Zone. The city has an average elevation 1500 meter above sea level. Bele lies between 6°55'05" North and 37°31'55" East.

Demographics
Bele is one of populated places in the Southern Nations, Nationalities, and Peoples' Region. Based on 2020 population projection conducted by central statistical agency the city has total population comprises 16,926. And Males count 8,217 and Females count 8,709.

References 

Wolayita
Populated places in the Southern Nations, Nationalities, and Peoples' Region
Cities and towns in Wolayita Zone
Ethiopia
Cities and towns in Ethiopia